The Romanian Chess Championship became a yearly event in 1946, and was held irregularly earlier. A series of national eliminating contests are played to select a 20-player field for the men's final. The women's final consists of 16 players.

Men's winners

{| class="sortable wikitable"
! Year !! City  !! Men's winner
|-
| 1926    || Sibiu     || Alexandru Tyroler
|-
| 1927    || Bucharest || Alexandru Tyroler
|-
| 1929    || Iași      || Alexandru Tyroler
|-
| 1930    || Cernăuţi  || János Balogh
|-
| 1931    || Bucharest || Stefan Erdélyi
|-
| 1932    || Bucharest || Boris Kostić
|-
| 1933-4  || Bucharest || Stefan Erdélyi
|-
| 1935    || Bucharest || Heinrich Silbermann
|-
| 1936    || Bucharest || Ivan Halic
|-
| 1943    || Bucharest || Petre Seimeanu
|-
| 1946    || Bucharest || Octav Troianescu
|-
| 1947    || Brașov    || Traian Ichim
|-
| 1948    || Bucharest || Toma Popa
|-
| 1949    || Bucharest || Stefan Erdélyi
|-
| 1950    || Bucharest || Ion Bălănel
|-
| 1951    || Bucharest || Tudor Flondor  Gheorghe-Gicǎ Alexadrescu
|-
| 1952    || Bucharest || Victor Ciocâltea
|-
| 1953    || Bucharest || Ion Bălănel
|-
| 1954    || Bucharest || Octav Troianescu
|-
| 1955    || Bucharest || Ion Bălănel
|-
| 1956    || Bucharest || Octav Troianescu
|-
| 1957    || Bucharest || Octav Troianescu
|-
| 1958    || Bucharest || Ion Bălănel
|-
| 1959    || Bucharest || Victor Ciocâltea
|-
| 1960    || Bucharest || Florin Gheorghiu
|-
| 1961    || Bucharest || Victor Ciocâltea
|-
| 1962    || Bucharest || Florin Gheorghiu
|-
| 1963    || Bucharest || Teodor Ghiţescu
|-
| 1964    || Bucharest || Florin Gheorghiu
|-
| 1965    || Bucharest || Florin Gheorghiu
|-
| 1966    || Bucharest || Florin Gheorghiu
|-
| 1967    || Bucharest || Florin Gheorghiu
|-
| 1968    || Bucharest || Octav Troianescu
|-
| 1969    || Bucharest || Victor Ciocâltea
|-
| 1970    || Bucharest || Victor Ciocâltea
|-
| 1971    || Bucharest || Victor Ciocâltea
|-
| 1972    || Bucharest || Carol Partoș
|-
| 1973    || Bucharest || Florin Gheorghiu
|-
| 1974    || Bucharest || Aurel Urzicǎ
|-
| 1975    || Sinaia    || Victor Ciocâltea
|-
| 1976    || Timișoara || Mihail-Viorel Ghindă
|-
| 1977    || Sibiu     || Florin Gheorghiu
|-
| 1978    || Herculane || Mihail-Viorel Ghindă
|-
| 1979    || Bucharest || Victor Ciocâltea
|-
| 1980    || Bucharest || Mihai Șubă
|-
| 1981    || Bucharest || Mihai Șubă
|-
| 1982    || Bucharest || Ovidiu Foișor
|-
| 1983    || Bucharest || Mihail-Viorel Ghindă
|-
| 1985(1) || Bucharest || Sergiu Henric Grünberg
|-
| 1985(2) || Timișoara || Mihai Șubă
|-
| 1986    ||               ||  Adrian Negulescu
|-
| 1987    ||               ||  Florin Gheorghiu
|-
| 1988    || Predeal   ||  Mihail Marin
|-
| 1989    ||               ||  Mihail-Viorel Ghindă
|-
| 1990    ||               ||  Ioan Biriescu
|-
| 1991    ||               ||  Dragos Dumitrache
|-
| 1992    ||               ||  Andrei Istrățescu
|-
| 1993    ||               ||  Liviu-Dieter Nisipeanu
|-
| 1994    ||               ||  Mihail Marin
|-
| 1995    ||               ||  Romeo Sorin Milu
|-
| 1996    || Herculane ||  Liviu-Dieter Nisipeanu
|-
| 1997    ||               ||  Bela Badea
|-
| 1998    || Bucharest ||  Bela Badea
|-
| 1999    || Iași      || Constantin Ionescu  Mihail Marin
|-
| 2000    ||               ||  Iulian Sofronie
|-
| 2001    ||               ||  Mircea Pârligras
|-
| 2002    ||               ||  Liviu-Dieter Nisipeanu
|-
| 2003    || Satu Mare ||  Mihai Grünberg
|-
| 2004    || Brașov    ||  Alin Berescu
|-
| 2005    || Băile Tușnad  ||  Alin Berescu
|-
| 2006    ||  Predeal  ||  Vlad-Cristian Jianu
|-
| 2007    ||  Amara  ||  Constantin Lupulescu
|-
| 2008    || Cluj-Napoca || Vladislav Nevednichy
|-
| 2009    || Eforie Nord || Eduard-Andrei Valeanu
|-
| 2010    || Băile Olănești || Constantin Lupulescu
|-
| 2011    || Sarata Monteoru    || Constantin Lupulescu
|-
| 2012    || Sarata Monteoru    || Vladislav Nevednichy
|-
| 2013    || Olănești    || Constantin Lupulescu
|-
| 2014    || Târgu Mureș    || Vlad-Victor Barnaure
|-
| 2015    || Călimăneşti-Căciulata    || Constantin Lupulescu
|-
| 2016    || Bucharest || Mircea Pârligras
|-
| 2017    || Călimănești-Căciulata    || Andrei Istrățescu
|-
| 2018    || Olănești    || Tiberiu Georgescu
|-
| 2019    || Olănești    || Lucian-Costin Miron
|-
|
|
|
|-
|2021
|Iași
|Bogdan-Daniel Deac
|-
|}

Women's winners

{| class="sortable wikitable"
! Year !! City !! Winner
|-
| 1936    || Bucharest || Rodica Manolescu (née Luţia)
|-
| 1949    || Bucharest || Lidia Habermann-Giuroiu
|-
| 1950    || Brașov    || Iolanda Szathmary
|-
| 1951    || Brașov    || Maria Albuleț
|-
| 1952    || Sibiu     || Elena Grabovieţchi
|-
| 1953    || Satu Mare || Lidia Giuroiu
|-
| 1954    || Bucharest || Lidia Giuroiu
|-
| 1955    || Oradea    || Maria Albuleț
|-
| 1956    || Cluj      || Maria Albuleț
|-
| 1957    || Ploiești || Rodica Manolescu
|-
| 1958    || Bucharest || Lidia Giuroiu
|-
| 1959    || Bucharest || Margareta Teodorescu
|-
| 1960    || Timișoara || Alexandra Nicolau
|-
| 1961    || Bucharest || Alexandra Nicolau
|-
| 1962    || Brașov    || Margareta Perevoznic
|-
| 1963    || Ploiești  || Alexandra Nicolau
|-
| 1964    || Oradea    || Alexandra Nicolau
|-
| 1965    || Herculane || Alexandra Nicolau
|-
| 1966    || Constanța || Elisabeta Polihroniade
|-
| 1967    || Arad      || Gertrude Baumstark
|-
| 1968    || Oradea    || Margareta Teodorescu
|-
| 1969    || Piatra Neamț  || Margareta Teodorescu
|-
| 1970    || Ploiești  || Elisabeta Polihroniade
|-
| 1971    || Brașov    || Elisabeta Polihroniade
|-
| 1972    || Cluj      || Elisabeta Polihroniade
|-
| 1973    || Brașov    || Alexandra Nicolau
|-
| 1974    || Timișoara || Margareta Teodorescu
|-
| 1975    || Alexandria || Elisabeta Polihroniade
|-
| 1976    || Piatra Neamț  || Elisabeta Polihroniade
|-
| 1977    || Sinaia    || Elisabeta Polihroniade
|-
| 1978    || Mediaș    ||  Daniela Nuțu
|-
| 1979    || Satu Mare || Daniela Nuțu
|-
| 1980    || Eforie    || Daniela Nuțu
|-
| 1981    || Herculane || Gertrude Baumstark
|-
| 1982    || Mediaș    || Eugenia Ghindă
|-
| 1983    || Herculane || Margareta Mureșan
|-
| 1984    ||               || Marina Pogorevici
|-
| 1985    || Herculane ||  Margareta Mureșan
|-
| 1986    ||               || Ligia Jicman
|-
| 1987    ||               || Margareta Mureșan
|-
| 1988    ||               || Gabriela Olărașu
|-
| 1989    ||               || Gabriela Olărașu  Cristina Adela Foișor
|-
| 1990    ||               || Mariana Ioniţa
|-
| 1991    ||               || Elena Luminița Radu-Cosma
|-
| 1992    ||               || Elena Luminița Radu-Cosma
|-
| 1993    ||               || Gabriela Olărașu
|-
| 1994    ||               || Corina Peptan
|-
| 1995    ||               || Corina Peptan
|-
| 1996    ||               || Gabriela Olărașu
|-
| 1997    ||               || Corina Peptan
|-
| 1998    ||               || Cristina Adela Foișor  Ligia Jicman
|-
| 1999    ||               || Gabriela Olărașu
|-
| 2000    ||               ||  Corina Peptan
|-
| 2001    ||               || Iulia Ionicǎ
|-
| 2002    ||               || Irina Ionescu Brandis
|-
| 2003    ||               || Gabriela Olărașu
|-
| 2004    ||               ||  Corina Peptan
|-
| 2005    ||               ||  Angela Dragomirescu
|-
| 2006    ||               || Ioana-Smaranda Pădurariu
|-
| 2007    ||               || Corina Peptan
|-
| 2008    || Napoca    || Corina Peptan
|-
| 2009    || Eforie Nord    || Corina Peptan
|-
| 2010    || Băile Olănești    || Elena-Luminița Cosma
|-
|-
| 2011    || Sarata Monteoru    || Cristina Adela Foișor
|-
|-
| 2012    || Sarata Monteoru    || Cristina Adela Foișor
|-
| 2013    || Olănești    || Cristina Adela Foișor
|-
| 2014    || Târgu Mureș    || Corina Peptan
|-
| 2015    || Călimăneşti-Căciulata    || Corina Peptan
|-
| 2016    || Bucharest || Elena-Luminița Cosma
|-
| 2017    || Călimăneşti-Căciulata    || Corina Peptan
|-
| 2018    || Olănești    || Irina Bulmaga
|-
| 2019    || Olănești    || Corina Peptan
|-
|
|
|
|-
|2021
|Iași
|Alessia-Mihaela Ciolacu 
|-
|}

References
 (brief background, winners through 1976)
 (winners and locales through 1985)
 (background and winners through 1968)
List of winners  from the Romanian Chess Federation
Constantin Lupulescu and Elena-Luminita Cosma are 2010 Romanian Chess Champions Chessdom.com

Chess national championships
Women's chess national championships
Chess in Romania
Chess